The Seymour Football Netball Club, nicknamed the Lions, is an Australian rules football and netball club based in the historic railway township of Seymour, Victoria.

Seymour first competed in the North East Football Association (NEFA) in 1891, then played in four consecutive grand finals, winning two in 1899 & 1902, then again in 1904,  1910 and 1912.

In 1913 with only Avenel, Euroa & Seymour teams left in the NEFA, a meeting was held & the Waranga North East Football Association was formed on - Tuesday, 13 May 1913 from the following teams - Avenel, Euroa, Murchieson, Nagambie, Rushworth & Seymour.

Seymour FC teams have compete in the Goulburn Valley League continuously since 1976. In recent times, Seymour has won the GVFL premiership three years in a row from 2005 to 2007 and finished runners up in 2008.

Senior Football Premierships
North East Football Association
1899, 1902, 1904, 1910, 1912.
Waranga North Eastern Football Association
1919, 1920, 1923, 1928, 1934, 1935, 1947, 1948, 1959, 1966, 1975
Goulburn Valley Football League
 1976, 1981, 1982, 1991, 2005, 2006, 2007

Senior Football - Runners Up
North East Football Association
1895, 1900, 1901, 1903, 1911
Waranga North Eastern Football Association
1924, 1925, 1927, 1950, 1956, 1960
Goulburn Valley Football League
2008, 2012

Reserves Football - Premierships
Waranga North Eastern Football Association
1952, 1953, 1954, 1967.
Goulburn Valley Football League
1983, 1986, 2006, 2008, 2019

Reserves Football - Runners Up
Goulburn Valley Football League
 2004

Thirds / Under 18's Football - Premierships
Goulburn Valley Football League
2007

References

External links
 Teamapp page
 Facebook page

Australian rules football clubs in Victoria (Australia)
1880 establishments in Australia
Australian rules football clubs established in 1880
Sports clubs established in 1880
Goulburn Valley Football League clubs
Netball teams in Victoria (Australia)